Pietro De Vico (1 February 1911 – 10 December 1999) was an Italian film actor. He appeared in 70 films between 1948 and 1991. He was born in Naples, and died in Rome. He was married, from 1937 until his death in 1999, to actress Anna Campori.

Selected filmography

 Christmas at Camp 119 (1947) - (uncredited)
 Toto Looks for a House (1949) - Cinese
 Toto the Sheik (1950) - L'arabo della stanza bianca
 Rome-Paris-Rome (1951) - Sposino
 The Passaguai Family (1951) - Il ragazzo di Marcella
 The Passaguai Family Gets Rich (1952) - Un autista
 Il viale della speranza (1953) - Tonio
 La valigia dei sogni (1953) - Il regista del provino
 Ore 10: lezione di canto (1955) - Pietro - uno dei Five Jolly
 Eighteen Year Olds (1955) - Campanelli
 Una voce, una chitarra, un po' di luna (1956) - Franz
 Sette canzoni per sette sorelle (1957) - Romeo
 Serenata a Maria (1957) - Pasqualino, the painter
 A sud niente di nuovo (1957)
 Il Conte di Matera (1958) - Golia
 Quando gli angeli piangono (1958)
 Il Medico Dei Pazzi (1959)
 Arriva la banda (1959)
 Fantasmi e ladri (1959) - Pietruccio
 La duchessa di Santa Lucia (1959) - Tommasino
 Ferdinando I, re di Napoli (1959) - The Foreteller of Lottery Results
 Sogno di una notte di mezza sbornia (1959) - Arturo
 The Employee (1960) - McNally
 Caccia al marito (1960) - Oscar Fantacci - the ice-cream seller
 The Two Rivals (1960) - Merigo
 Appuntamento a Ischia (1960) - Rotunno's Pianist
 Mariti in pericolo (1960) - Parrucchiere
 Who Hesitates Is Lost (1960) - Il cameriere
 Caravan petrol (1960) - Alfonsino
 La moglie di mio marito (1961) - Il posteggiatore
 Sua Eccellenza si fermò a mangiare (1961) - Pierino
 Come September (1961) - Poliziotto (uncredited)
 5 marines per 100 ragazze (1961) - Attendente del generale
 Totòtruffa 62 (1961) - Contatore di piccioni
 The Last Judgment (1961)
 Accroche-toi, y'a du vent! (1961) - Un brigadiere
 Le magnifiche 7 (1961) - Calogero
 Pesci d'oro e bikini d'argento (1961)
 Rocco e le sorelle (1961)
 Mariti a congresso (1961)
 Che femmina!! E... che dollari! (1961)
 Totò Diabolicus (1962) - Il Paziente
 Nerone '71 (1962) - Assistente della regista
 Gladiator of Rome (1962) - Pompilio
 Lo sceicco rosso (1962) - Ignacio
 Twist, lolite e vitelloni (1962)
 I soliti rapinatori a Milano (1963)
 The Swindlers (1963) - Chancellor (segment "Pretura, La")
 I marziani hanno 12 mani (1964) - Cameriere d'Hotel
 The Masked Man Against the Pirates (1964)
 What Ever Happened to Baby Toto? (1964)
 Sedotti e bidonati (1964) - Master builder
 Napoleone a Firenze (1964)
 Cadavere a spasso (1965) - Nicolino
 Soldati e caporali (1965) - Nicola Cacace
 Mi vedrai tornare (1966) - Cameriere delle Aleardi
 Giorno caldo al Paradiso Show (1966)
 Don't Sting the Mosquito (1967)
 Una ragazza tutta d'oro (1967) - The Thief
 Soldati e capelloni (1967)
 La vuole lui... lo vuole lei (1968)
 Pensiero d'amore (1969) - Enrico
 Lisa dagli occhi blu (1970) - Policeman
 Lady Barbara (1970) - Bagnasco
 The Swinging Confessors (1970)
 Brancaleone at the Crusades (1970) - Un giudice della strega
 Man of the Year (1971) - Guida turistica (uncredited)
 Sgarro alla camorra (1973) - 'Gnasso'
 The Payoff (1978) - Guardiano posteggio auto
 Figlio mio, sono innocente! (1978) - Pilade Schiattato
 The Mass Is Ended (1985) - Frate / Friar
 Scandalo segreto (1990)
 Ladri di futuro (1991)

References

External links

 Massimo Colella, Profilo biografico di attori partenopei del XX secolo: II. Pietro De Vico, 2022 (https://www.centrostuditeatro.it/2022/03/pietro-de-vico/).

1911 births
1999 deaths
Italian male film actors
20th-century Italian male actors